The following highways are numbered 692:

United States